Senchineoil or Seincheinéal was the name of the early rulers, possibly pre-Gaelic, of what is now central and east County Galway and south County Roscommon, Ireland.

Overview

The term Senchineoil (sen = old; chineoil = people/tribe/kindred) was used by the Uí Maine to describe aithechtuatha—unfree, enslaved vassal peoples—who they subjugated during the founding of their kingdom sometime prior to the 5th century AD. They are described as:

"Seincheinéal of the old plain of Soghan/stretched eastward over [the river] Suck/until it reached Delbhna of Dealbhaoth; manly were the good heroes, like a flame."

It is not known by what term the Senchineoil described themselves, or even if it was in Gaelic. Their last recorded ruler was Cian d'Fhearaibh Bolg.

See also

 Uí Fiachrach Aidhne
 Clann Fhergail
 Clann Taidg
 Delbhna Tir Dha Locha
 Muintir Murchada
 Uí Maine
 Soghain
 Trícha Máenmaige
 Uí Díarmata
 Cóiced Ol nEchmacht
 Síol Anmchadha
 Iar Connacht
 Maigh Seola
 Cenél Áeda na hEchtge
 Cenél Guaire
 Muintir Máelfináin
 Conmaícne Cenéoil Dubáin
 Conmaícne Cúile Toland
 Bunrath
 Uí Briúin Rátha
 Tír Maine
 Uí Briúin Seola
 Machaire Riabhach
 Maigh Mucruimhe
 Airthir Connacht
 Meadraige
 Corca Moga
 Óic Bethra

References
 The Senchineoil and the Sogain: Differentiating between the pre-Celtic and early Celtic Tribes of Central East Galway, Joseph Mannion, Journal of the Galway Archaeological and Historical Society, Volume 58, pp. 165–170, 2006.

History of County Galway
Historical Celtic peoples
Connacht
Geography of County Galway
Tribes of ancient Ireland
Ethnic groups in Ireland
History of County Roscommon
Fir Bolg